"She's My Man" is a song by American pop rock band Scissor Sisters, released on March 5, 2007, as the third single from their second studio album, Ta-Dah (2006). The song's music shares some similarities with Elton John's rhythm structure for "I'm Still Standing", although with a slower beat and lower pitch.

"She's My Man" became another UK hit for the group, peaking at number 29 on the UK Singles Chart, and reached the top 20 in Finland and Norway. Lukas Ridgeston appears as the cover model on artwork for the single.

Music video
The single's video was directed by Nagi Noda, and shot in Tokyo. It uses the Kuroko technique, where the band members act out a scene round a dining table against a black background. Stagehands (dressed completely in black, and effectively invisible) move props, furniture and bits of costume to surreal effect. Jake Shears and Babydaddy have said that there was only one visual effect in this video, but its whereabouts have not yet been confirmed.

Track listings
10-inch vinyl square picture disc
 "She's My Man" (album version) – 5:31

UK CD single
 "She's My Man" (album version) – 5:31
 "She's My Man" (Goose remix edit) – 4:18

International CD single
 "She's My Man" (album version) – 5:31
 "Transistor" – 4:51
 "She's My Man" (Goose remix edit) – 4:18
 "She's My Man" (music video)

UK iTunes digital single
 "She's My Man" (album version) – 5:31
 "She's My Man" (Mock and Toof remix) – 8:09

Charts

Release history

References

External links
 Scissor Sisters official site
 "She's My Man" music video
 "She's My Man" lyrics from Underground Illusion: The Ultimate Scissor Sisters Database

2006 songs
2007 singles
Polydor Records singles
Scissor Sisters songs
Songs written by Babydaddy
Songs written by Jake Shears